A list of units and formations of the Spanish Army in 1990 is given below.

From 1958–60 the Spanish Army reorganized along "Pentomic" five-component division lines. In 1965 a reorganization was undertaken that divided Spanish Army forces into Immediate Intervention (Field Army) and Operational Territorial Defence (Territorial Army) formations, adopting a structure of divisions broken down into brigades. However, from 1984 a modernization plan was underway aimed at improving the deployability of the army and updating its equipment. The Modernización del Ejército de Tierra (META) plan, as it was called, only achieved its objectives partially, yet the army was reorganized.

After the end of the Spanish Civil War, infantry regiments maintained a traditional and ceremonial identity, but were not an operational level of command. Operational command goes from brigades directly to infantry battalions, bypassing the regimental level. Spanish Army armoured units were designated "Armoured Infantry Battalions" and are considered part of the infantry.

Army General Staff 
 Army General Staff, in Madrid
 Infantry Regiment "Inmemorial del Rey" No. 1, in Madrid

Military Region I Central 

The Military Region I Central (Región Militar I Centro) with its headquarters in Madrid encompassed the Community of Madrid (including the Province of Madrid) and the provinces of Ávila, Ciudad Real, Cuenca, Guadalajara, Segovia, and Toledo, all of Castilla–La Mancha as well as the provinces of  Badajoz and Cáceres in Extremadura.

 Headquarters, in Madrid
 Special Operations Group "Órdenes Militares" I, in Colmenar Viejo
 Construction Battalion I, in Madrid
 Signal Company No. 1, in Madrid

Armored Division "Brunete" No. 1 
 Division Headquarters, in El Pardo
 Mechanized Infantry Brigade XI, in Bótoa
 Mechanized Infantry Regiment "Saboya" No. 6, in Bótoa
 Mechanized Infantry Battalion "Cantabria" I/6 
 Mechanized Infantry Battalion "Las Navas" II/6
 Mechanized Infantry Regiment "Castilla" No. 16, in Bótoa
 Mechanized Infantry Battalion "Alcántara" III/16
 Armored Infantry Battalion "Mérida" IV/16
 Field Artillery Group XI, in Mérida
 Engineer Battalion XI, in Badajoz
 Logistic Group XI, in Mérida
 Armored Brigade XII, in El Goloso
 Mechanized Infantry Regiment "Asturias" No. 31, in El Goloso
 Mechanized Infantry Battalion "Covadonga" I/31
 Armored Infantry Regiment "Alcázar de Toledo" No. 61, in El Goloso
 Armored Infantry Battalion "Uad Ras" II/61
 Armored Infantry Battalion "León" III/61
 Field Artillery Group XII, in El Goloso
 Engineer Battalion XII, in El Goloso
 Logistic Group XII, in El Goloso
 Light Armored Cavalry Regiment "Villaviciosa" No. 14, in Retamares
 Field Artillery Regiment No. 11, in Fuencarral
 Field Artillery Group I/11
 Field Artillery Group II/11
 Engineer Regiment No. 1, in Colmenar Viejo
 Divisional Logistic Grouping No. 1, in Colmenar Viejo
 Light Anti-aircraft Artillery Group I, in Vicálvaro

Military Region II South 

The Military Region II South (Región Militar II Sur) with its headquarters in Seville covered Andalusia (Provinces of Almería, Cádiz, Córdoba, Granada, Huelva, Jaén, Málaga, and Seville), the exclaves of Ceuta and Melilla, and the Plazas de soberanía.

 Headquarters, in Seville
 Special Operations Group "Santa Fe" II, in Granada
 Construction Battalion II, in Seville
 Signal Company No. 2, in Seville

Motorized Infantry Division "Guzmán el Bueno" No. 2 
 Division Headquarters, in Granada
 Mechanized Infantry Brigade XXI, in Cerro Muriano
 Mechanized Infantry Regiment "La Reina" No. 2, in Cerro Muriano
 Mechanized Infantry Battalion "Princesa" I/2
 Mechanized Infantry Battalion "Lepanto" II/2
 Mechanized Infantry Regiment "Córdoba" No. 10, in Cerro Muriano
 Mechanized Infantry Battalion "Almansa" III/10
 Armored Infantry Battalion "Málaga" IV/10
 Field Artillery Group XXI, in Cerro Muriano
 Engineer Battalion XXI, in Córdoba
 Logistic Group XXI, in Cerro Muriano
 Motorized Infantry Brigade XXII, in Jerez de la Frontera
 Mixed Infantry Regiment "Soria" No. 9, in Seville
 Motorized Infantry Battalion "Tarifa" I/9
 Armored Infantry Battalion "Argel" II/9
 Motorized Infantry Regiment "Pavía" No. 19, in San Roque
 Motorized Infantry Battalion "Cádiz" III/19
 Motorized Infantry Battalion "Álava" IV/19
 Field Artillery Group XXII, in Camposoto
 Engineer Battalion XXII, in Camposoto
 Logistic Group XXII, in Camposoto
 Motorized Infantry Brigade XXIII, in Almería
 Motorized Infantry Regiment "Aragón" No. 17, in Viator
 Motorized Infantry Battalion "Nápoles" I/17
 Motorized Infantry Battalion "Simancas" II/17
 Mixed Infantry Regiment "Granada" No. 34, in Viator
 Motorized Infantry Battalion "Extremadura" III/34
 Armored Infantry Battalion "Almería" IV/34
 Field Artillery Group XXIII, in Viator
 Engineer Battalion XXIII, in Viator
 Logistic Group XXIII, in Viator
 Light Armored Cavalry Regiment "Sagunto" No. 7, in Seville
 Field Artillery Regiment No. 14, in Seville
 Field Artillery Group I/14
 Field Artillery Group II/14
 Engineer Regiment No. 2, in Seville
 Divisional Logistic Grouping No. 2, in Granada
 Light Anti-aircraft Artillery Group II, in Granada

Melilla General Command 
The Melilla General Command was headed by a two-star general and tasked with the defense of the Spanish exclave of Melilla in Africa.

 Command Headquarters, in Melilla
 Armored Cavalry Regiment "Alcántara" No. 10, in Melilla
 Tercio "Gran Capitán" No. 1 of the Legion, in Melilla
 Motorized Infantry Bandera "Casa de Borgoña" I/1
 Motorized Infantry Bandera "Carlos V/I" II/1
 Motorized Infantry Regiment "Regulares de Melilla" No. 52, in Melilla
 Motorized Infantry Battalion "Alhucemas" I/52
 Motorized Infantry Battalion "Rif" II/52
 Field Artillery Regiment No. 32, in Melilla
 Field Artillery Group I/32
 Engineer Regiment No. 8, in Melilla
 Light Anti-aircraft Artillery Group VII, in Melilla

Ceuta General Command 
The Ceuta General Command was headed by a two-star general and tasked with the defense of the Spanish exclave of Ceuta in Africa.

 Command Headquarters, in Ceuta
 Armored Cavalry Regiment "Montesa" No. 3, in Ceuta
 Tercio "Duque de Alba" No. 2 of the Legion, in Ceuta
 Motorized Infantry Bandera "Cristo de Lepanto" IV/2
 Motorized Infantry Bandera "Gonzalo Fernández de Córdoba" V/2
 Motorized Infantry Regiment "Regulares de Ceuta" No. 54, in Ceuta
 Motorized Infantry Battalion "Tetuan" I/54
 Motorized Infantry Battalion "Larache" II/54
 Mixed Artillery Regiment No. 30, in Ceuta
 Field Artillery Group I/30
 Coastal Artillery Group II/30
 Engineer Regiment No. 7, in Ceuta
 Light Anti-aircraft Artillery Group VI, in Ceuta

Military Region III Levant 

The Military Region III Levant with its headquarters in Valencia encompassed the province of Albacete of Castilla-La Mancha, and the Valencian Community (composed of the provinces of Alicante, Castellón, and Valencia), as well as the Region of Murcia and the Balearic Islands.

 Headquarters, in Valencia
 Special Operations Group "Valencia" III, in Rabasa
 Construction Battalion III, in Valencia
 Signal Company No. 3, in Valencia

Mechanized Infantry Division "Maestrazgo" No. 3 
 Division Headquarters, in Valencia
 Mechanized Infantry Brigade XXXI, in Castellón de la Plana
 Mechanized Infantry Regiment "Tetuán" No. 14, in Castellón de la Plana
 Mechanized Infantry Battalion "Tarragona" I/14
 Mechanized Infantry Battalion "Guadalajara" II/14
 Mechanized Infantry Regiment "Vizcaya" No. 21, in Bétera
 Mechanized Infantry Battalion "Barbastro" III/21
 Armored Infantry Battalion "Otumba" IV/21
 Field Artillery Group XXXI, in Paterna
 Engineer Battalion XXXI, in Bétera
 Logistic Group XXXI, in Bétera
 Mechanized Infantry Brigade XXXII, in Cartagena
 Mechanized Infantry Regiment "Mallorca" No. 13, in Lorca
 Mechanized Infantry Battalion "Murcia" I/13
 Mechanized Infantry Battalion "San Fernando" II/13
 Mechanized Infantry Regiment "España" No. 18, in Cartagena
 Mechanized Infantry Battalion "Sevilla" III/18
 Armored Infantry Battalion "Bailén" IV/18
 Field Artillery Group XXXII, in Murcia
 Engineer Battalion XXXII, in Cartagena
 Logistic Group XXXII, in Cartagena
 Light Armored Cavalry Regiment "Lusitania" No. 8, in Marines
 Field Artillery Regiment No. 17, in Paterna
 Field Artillery Group I/17
 Field Artillery Group II/17
 Engineer Regiment No. 3, in Marines
 Divisional Logistic Grouping No. 3, in Marines
 Light Anti-aircraft Artillery Group III, in Paterna

Balearic Military Zone 
The Balearic Military Zone was headed by a two-star general and encompassed the Balearic Islands. Its three troop commands were headed by one-star generals.

 Headquarters, in Palma de Mallorca
 Palma Troops Command, in Palma de Mallorca
 Motorized Infantry Regiment "Palma" No. 47, in Palma de Mallorca
 Motorized Infantry Battalion "Filipinas" I/47
 Mixed Artillery Regiment No. 91, in Palma de Mallorca
 Field Artillery Group I/91
 Light Anti-aircraft Artillery Group II/91
 Coastal Artillery Group III/91
 Engineer Battalion XIV, in Palma de Mallorca
 Mahón Troops Command, in Mahón
 Motorized Infantry Battalion "Mahón", in Mahón
 Field Artillery Group V, in Es Mercadal
 Ibiza Troops Command, in Ibiza
 Motorized Infantry Battalion "Teruel", in Ibiza
 Coastal Artillery Group VI, in San Carlos
 Field Artillery Group VII, in Ibiza

Military Region IV Eastern Pyrenees 

The Military Region IV Eastern Pyrenees (Región Militar IV Pirenaica Oriental) with its headquarters in Barcelona covered Aragon (Provinces of Huesca, Teruel, and Zaragoza) and Catalonia (Provinces of Barcelona, Girona, Lleida, and Tarragona).

 Headquarters, in Barcelona
 Special Operations Group "Almogávares" IV, in Barcelona
 Construction Battalion IV, in Barcelona
 Signal Company No. 4, in Barcelona

Mountain Infantry Division "Urgel" No. 4 
 Division Headquarters, in Lleida
 Mountain Hunters Brigade XLI, in Lleida
 Mountain Hunters Regiment "Arapiles" No. 62, in La Seu d'Urgell
 Mountain Hunters Battalion "Alba de Tormes" I/62
 Mountain Hunters Battalion "Cataluña" II/62
 Mountain Hunters Regiment "Barcelona" No. 63, in Lleida
 Mountain Hunters Battalion "Chiclana" III/63
 Mountain Hunters Battalion "Badajoz" IV/63
 Mountain Field Artillery Group XLI, in San Clemente
 Engineer Battalion XLI, in San Clemente
 Logistic Group XLI, in San Clemente
 Skiers Company No. 41, in Vielha
 High Mountain Hunters Brigade XLII, in Jaca
 High Mountain Hunters Regiment "Galicia" No. 64, in Jaca
 High Mountain Hunters Battalion "Pirineos" I/64
 High Mountain Hunters Battalion "Gravelinas" II/64
 High Mountain Hunters Regiment "Valladolid" No. 65, in Huesca
 High Mountain Hunters Battalion "Gerona" III/65
 Field Artillery Group XLII, in Huesca
 Engineer Battalion XLII, in Huesca
 Logistic Group XLII, in Huesca
 Field Artillery Regiment No. 21, in Lleida
 Field Artillery Group I/21
 Field Artillery Group II/21
 Engineer Regiment No. 4, in Lleida
 Divisional Logistic Grouping No. 4, in Lleida

Cavalry Brigade "Castillejos" II 
 Brigade Headquarters, in Zaragoza
 Armored Cavalry Regiment "Pavía" No. 4, in Aranjuez
 Light Armored Cavalry Regiment "Numancia" No. 9, in Zaragoza
 Light Armored Cavalry Regiment "España" No. 11, in Zaragoza
 Field Artillery Regiment No. 20, in Zaragoza
 Engineer Battalion II, in Zaragoza
 Logistic Group II, in Zaragoza

Military Region V Western Pyrenees 

The Military Region V Western Pyrenees (Región Militar V Pirenaica Occidental) with its headquarters in Burgos encompassed the provinces of the Basque Country (Álava, Biscay, Burgos and Gipuzkoa), the province of Soria in Castile and León and the regions of Cantabria, La Rioja and Navarre .

 Headquarters, in Burgos
 Special Operations Group "San Marcial" V, in Castrillo del Val
 Construction Battalion V, in Castrillo del Val
 Signal Company No. 5, in Castrillo del Val

Mountain Division "Navarra" No. 5 
 Division Headquarters, in Pamplona
 Mountain Hunters Brigade LI, in San Sebastián
 Mountain Hunters Regiment "América" No. 66, in Pamplona
 Mountain Hunters Battalion "Montejurra" I/66
 Mountain Hunters Battalion "Estella" II/66
 Mountain Hunters Regiment "Tercio Viejo de Sicilia" No. 67, in San Sebastián
 Mountain Hunters Battalion "Legazpi" III/67
 Field Artillery Group LI, in Logroño
 Engineer Battalion LI, in San Sebastián
 Logistic Group LI, in Agoncillo
 Skiers Company No. 51, in Estella
 Motorized Infantry Brigade LII, in Vitoria
 Mixed Infantry Regiment "Flandes" No. 30, in Vitoria
 Motorized Infantry Battalion "Cuenca" I/30
 Armored Infantry Battalion "Burgos" II/30
 Motorized Infantry Regiment "Garellano" No. 45, in Bilbao
 Motorized Infantry Battalion "Guipúzcoa" III/45
 Motorized Infantry Battalion "Milan" IV/45
 Field Artillery Group LII, in Vitoria
 Engineer Battalion LII, in Vitoria
 Logistic Group LII, in Araca
 Field Artillery Regiment No. 46, in Castrillo del Val
 Field Artillery Group I/46
 Field Artillery Group II/46
 Engineer Regiment No. 5, in Castrillo del Val
 Divisional Logistic Grouping No. 5, in Castrillo del Val

Military Region VI Northwest 

The Military Region VI Northwest (Región Militar VI Noroeste) with its headquarters in A Coruña covered Asturias, Galicia (Provinces of A Coruña, Lugo, Ourense, and Pontevedra), and the provinces of León, Palencia, Salamanca, Valladolid, and Zamora in Castile and León.

 Headquarters, in A Coruña
 Special Operations Group "La Victoria" VI, in A Coruña
 Construction Battalion VI, in A Coruña
 Signal Company No. 6, in A Coruña

Cavalry Brigade "Jarama" I 
 Brigade Headquarters, in Salamanca
 Light Armored Cavalry Regiment "Santiago" No. 1, in Salamanca
 Light Armored Cavalry Regiment "Almansa" No. 5, in León
 Armored Cavalry Regiment "Farnesio" No. 12, in Valladolid
 Field Artillery Regiment No. 41, in Segovia
 Engineer Battalion I, in Salamanca
 Logistic Group I, in Salamanca

Canary Military Zone 

The Canary Military Zone with its headquarters in Santa Cruz de Tenerife covered the Canary Islands (Provinces of Santa Cruz de Tenerife and Las Palmas). The Military Zone was headed by a three-star general and its two troop commands were headed by two-star generals.

 Headquarters, in Santa Cruz de Tenerife
 Canary Signal Battalion, in Santa Cruz
 Tenerife Troops Command, in Santa Cruz
 Motorized Infantry Regiment "Tenerife" No. 49, in Santa Cruz
 Motorized Infantry Battalion I/49
 Motorized Infantry Battalion II/49
 Motorized Infantry Battalion "La Palma", on La Palma
 Mixed Artillery Regiment No. 93, in Santa Cruz
 Coastal Artillery Group I/93
 Light Anti-aircraft Artillery Group II/93
 Field Artillery Group III/93
 Engineer Battalion XV, in Santa Cruz
 Las Palmas Troops Command, in Las PalmasNote 1
 Motorized Infantry Regiment "Canarias" No. 50, in Las Palmas
 Motorized Infantry Battalion I/50
 Motorized Infantry Battalion II/50
 Motorized Infantry Battalion "Lanzarote", on Lanzarote
 Mixed Artillery Regiment No. 94, in Las Palmas
 Light Anti-aircraft Artillery Group I/94
 Field Artillery Group II/94
 Engineer Battalion XVI, in Las Palmas

Note 1: The Tercio "Juan de Austria" No. 3 of the Legion was based on Fuerteventura and changed command from the Las Palmas Troops Command to the Legion Command in 1988.

General Reserve 

The General Reserve based in Málaga was headed by a two-star general and consisted of the Paratroopers Infantry Brigade, Airmobile Light Infantry Brigade, Legion Command, Army Airmobile Forces and five commands; all headed by a 1-star general.

 Headquarters, in Málaga

Paratroopers Infantry Brigade 
 Brigade Headquarters, in Alcalá de Henares
 Paratroopers Infantry Bandera "Roger de Flor" I, in Alcalá de Henares
 Paratroopers Infantry Bandera "Roger de Lauria" II, in Alcalá de Henares
 Paratroopers Infantry Bandera "Ortiz de Zárate" III, in Alcalá de Henares
 Paratroopers Field Artillery Group, in Alcalá de Henares
 Paratroopers Engineer Battalion, in Alcalá de Henares
 Paratroopers Logistic Group, in Alcalá de Henares

Airmobile Light Infantry Brigade 
 Brigade Headquarters, in Figueirido
 Airmobile Light Infantry Regiment "Príncipe" No. 3, in Siero
 Airmobile Light Infantry Battalion "Toledo" I/3
 Airmobile Light Infantry Battalion "San Quintin" II/3
 Airmobile Light Infantry Regiment "Isabel La Católica" No. 29, in Figueirido
 Airmobile Light Infantry Battalion "Zamora" III/29
 Airmobile Light Infantry Battalion "Zaragoza" IV/29
 Airmobile Field Artillery Group, in Figueirido
 Airmobile Engineer Battalion, in A Coruña
 Airmobile Logistic Group, in Figueirido

Legion Command 
The Legion Command was created during the META reform to oversee recruiting and training of the units of the Spanish Legion. For historic reasons the regiments of the Legion are called "Tercios" and the battalions "Banderas".

 Command Headquarters, in Málaga
 Tercio "Juan de Austria" No. 3 of the Legion, on Fuerteventura
 Motorized Infantry Bandera "Valenzuela" VII/3
 Motorized Infantry Bandera "Colón" VIII/3
 Tercio "Alejandro Farnesio" No. 4 of the Legion, in Ronda
 Airmobile Infantry Bandera "Millán Astray" X/4
 Special Operations Bandera XIX/4

Army Airmobile Forces 
 Headquarters, in Colmenar Viejo
 Attack Helicopter Battalion I, in Almagro
 Maneuver Helicopter Battalion II, in Bétera
 Maneuver Helicopter Battalion III, in Agoncillo
 Maneuver Helicopter Battalion IV, in Dos Hermanas
 Transport Helicopter Battalion V, in Colmenar Viejo
 Maneuver Helicopter Battalion VI, in Los Rodeos
 Army Airmobile Forces Signal Battalion, in Colmenar Viejo
 Army Airmobile Forces Training Center, in Colmenar Viejo
 Army Airmobile Forces Logistic Unit, in Colmenar Viejo
 Helicopter Maintenance Depot and Center, in Colmenar Viejo

Coastal Artillery Command 
 Command Headquarters, in Tarifa
 Coastal Artillery Regiment No. 4, in San Fernando
 Coastal Artillery Group I/4
 Coastal Artillery Group II/4
 Coastal Artillery Regiment No. 5, in Algeciras

Field Artillery Command 
 Command Headquarters, in San Andrés del Rabanedo
 Target Acquisition Artillery Regiment No. 61, in San Andrés del Rabanedo
 Rocket Launcher Artillery Regiment No. 62, in Astorga
 Field Artillery Regiment No. 63, in San Andrés del Rabanedo

Anti-aircraft Artillery Command 
 Command Headquarters, in Madrid
 Anti-aircraft Artillery Regiment No. 71, in Campamento
 Light Anti-aircraft Artillery Group I/71
 Anti-aircraft Missile Group II/71 (Roland II)
 Anti-aircraft Artillery Regiment No. 72, in Barcelona
 Anti-aircraft Missile Group I/72 (Hawk)
 Light Anti-aircraft Artillery Group II/72
 Anti-aircraft Artillery Regiment No. 73, in Cartagena
 Anti-aircraft Missile Group I/73 (Aspide)
 Light Anti-aircraft Artillery Group II/73
 Anti-aircraft Artillery Regiment No. 74, in Jerez de la Frontera
 Anti-aircraft Missile Group I/74 (Hawk)
 Anti-aircraft Artillery Group II/74
 Anti-aircraft Artillery Regiment No. 75, in Valladolid
 Light Anti-aircraft Artillery Group I/75
 Light Anti-aircraft Artillery Group II/75
 Anti-aircraft Artillery Regiment No. 76, in Ferrol
 Light Anti-aircraft Artillery Group I/76
 Light Anti-aircraft Artillery Group II/76

Engineer Command 
 Command Headquarters, in Fuencarral
 Special Engineer Regiment No. 11, in Salamanca
 Road Building Battalion I/11
 Construction Battalion II/11
 Bridge and Special Engineer Regiment No. 12, in Zaragoza
 Railway Engineer Regiment No. 13, in Cuatro Vientos
 Railway Mobilization and Operations Regiment No. 14, in Fuencarral

Signal Command 
 Command Headquarters, in El Pardo
 Tactical Signal Regiment No. 21, in El Pardo
 Special Signal Regiment No. 22, in Madrid

Army Logistic Support Command 

The three interregional logistic support commands were created in 1987 and subordinates to the Army Logistic Support Command. Each logistic support grouping managed all the vehicle parks, workshops, ammunition magazines and other logistic services in their assigned area.

 Command Headquarters, in Madrid
 Interregional Logistic Support Command Center, in Madrid
 Logistic Support Grouping No. 11, in Campamento (supporting the I Military Region)
 Logistic Support Grouping No. 31, in Paterna (supporting the III Military Region)
 Logistic Support Grouping No. 61, in Valladolid (supporting the VI Military Region)
 Logistic Support Grouping No. 71, in Palma de Mallorca (supporting the Balearic Military Zone)
 Interregional Logistic Support Command South, in Seville
 Logistic Support Grouping No. 21, in Seville (supporting the II Military Region)
 Logistic Support Grouping No. 22, in Granada (supporting the II Military Region)
 Logistic Support Grouping No. 23, in Ceuta (supporting the Ceuta General Command)
 Logistic Support Grouping No. 24, in Melilla (supporting the Melilla General Command)
 Logistic Support Grouping No. 81, in La Laguna and Las Palmas (supporting the Canary Military Zone)
 Interregional Logistic Support Command North, in Zaragoza
 Logistic Support Grouping No. 41, in Zaragoza (supporting the IV Military Region)
 Logistic Support Grouping No. 51, in Castrillo del Val (supporting the V Military Region)

The logistic support groupings No. 71 and No. 81 operationally assigned to the Balearic Military Zone respectively the Canary Military Zone.

Graphic overview of the Spanish Army in 1990

Geographic distribution of the Spanish Army in 1990

See also 
 Structure of the Spanish Army for the current structure of the Spanish Army.

References

 
 Diego A. Ruiz Palmer, "Spain's Security Policy and Army in the 1990s," Parameters, 1990.
 Xavier I. Taibo, "The Spanish Army Approaches its Future," Jane's Military Review, (1986) (London, Jane's, 1986) pp53–68

Spanish Army
Army units and formations of Spain